Knights: In Search of the Ravishing Princess Herzelinde (German:  Ritter – Auf der Suche nach der hinreißenden Herzelinde) is a 2008 German film directed by Til Schweiger. It stars Til Schweiger, Rick Kavanian, Julia Dietze, Thomas Gottschalk and Udo Kier. The film centers on two knights, Lanze (Schweiger) and Erdal (Kavanian) who are trying to save kidnapped Princess Herzelinde (Dietze) from the Black Knight (Tobias Moretti). Some characters from Der Ring des Nibelungen by Richard Wagner, such as Siegfried (Thierry van Werveke) and Brünnhilde (Stefanie Stappenbeck) appear in the film.

Plot
In the Middle Ages, the dodgy businessman Count Luipold Trumpf approaches the financially troubled King Gunther to court his daughter, Princess Herzelinde. Herzelinde refuses, and so Trumpf has her kidnapped by the Black Knight. So the shy and naive knight Lanzethe princess's bodyguardand the Turkish petty thug Erdal, the "half" knight, set out to free Princess Herzelinde from the Black Knight's clutches. But it's not enough that their quest is constantly disrupted by the people they meet during their travelsLanze and Erdal also fall victim to an insidious plot by the royal family. Erdal invents the Döner kebab along the way. Roberto Blanco makes a guest appearance as the beverage supplier for the Black Knight's hippie commune. In the end, with the help of his friend Erdal, the naive knight Lanze becomes sensitive and learns to talk to women, and is allowed to marry his sweetheart Herzelinde.

Cast 
 Til Schweiger as Knight Lanze
 Rick Kavanian as Half–Knight Erdal
 Julia Dietze as Princess Herzelinde
 Thomas Gottschalk as King Gunther
 Udo Kier as Luipold Trumpf
 Tobias Moretti as the Black Knight
 Mark Keller as Prince Gustav
 Ralph Herforth as Walter Sattler
 Gregor Bloéb as Jailer
 Thierry van Werveke as Siegfried
 Stefanie Stappenbeck as Brünnhilde
 Tim Wilde as Jailer's Assistant
 Anna Maria Mühe as Magd
 Denis Moschitto as the Archer
 Hannelore Elsner as Hexe
 Johannes Heesters as an old scientist
 Dieter Hallervorden as the Horse Seller
 Roberto Blanco as Roberto
 Helmut Markwort as the Chief of the Tabloid

Critical reception 
The film earned mostly negative reviews from film critics. German newspaper Süddeutsche Zeitung described it as an "embarrassing parade of celebrities", "[...] Til Schweiger has got both the critics and the press to hate him for this film. Not without reason. [...] The film is just as lame as its trailer". TV Movie.de wrote, "If the jokes were better and went beyond adolescent humor, it would become a real comedy". Cinefacts.de added that "Til [Schweiger] once again tried in the comedy genre, but that, unlike his previous films Barfuss and Keinohrhasen, it lacks gags". Dorit Koch from General Anzeiger Bonn wrote "Though the film lacks good gags, the famous cast will attract the audience". Cinema.de described the film as a "shallow medieval farce with a few funny ideas". "Til Schweiger directs and stars in his middle age film with childish jokes and Monty Python style. You can try to find it funny, but you won't", the Welt wrote.

Music 
The  Knights – In Search of the Ravishing Princess Herzelinde soundtrack album was released through the Interscope Records on 19 December 2008, and includes the song "Walta Sattla", performed by Til Schweiger. In the review of the album, the Bild wrote that "unlike the film itself, the soundtrack is just beautiful, not a funny parade".

Release dates

References

External links 
 Official Website
 

2008 films
2008 comedy films
German comedy films
2000s German-language films
Films directed by Til Schweiger
2000s parody films
Films set in the Middle Ages
Films set in the Holy Roman Empire
Warner Bros. films
2000s German films